Taigi can refer to 

 Blessed Anna Maria Taigi - born Anna Maria Giannetti - (1769- 1837) was an Italian Roman Catholic professed member from the Secular Trinitarians
 Taiwanese Hokkien, known as Tâi-gí or Tâi-gú.
Taigi Unicode, a TrueType font designed to display Pe̍h-ōe-jī, a romanization for Taiwanese Language.
Taygi or Taigi, a dialect of the Mator language
 All-Japan Taigi Competition